Peruvian Ribereño Spanish or Peruvian Coastal Spanish is the form of the Spanish language spoken in the coastal region of Peru. The Spanish spoken in Coastal Peru has four characteristic forms today: the original one, that of the inhabitants of Lima (known as limeños) near the Pacific coast and parts south, (formerly from the old section of the city from where it spread to the entire coastal region); the inland immigrant sociolect (more influenced by Andean languages); the Northern, in Trujillo, Chiclayo or Piura; and the Southern. The majority of Peruvians speak Peruvian Coast Spanish, as Peruvian Coast Spanish is the standard dialect of Spanish in Peru.

Between 1535 and 1739, Lima was the capital of the Spanish Empire in South America, from where Hispanic culture spread, and its speech became the "purest" since it was the home of the famous University of San Marcos of Lima. Also, it was the city that had the highest number of titles of nobility from Castile outside of Spain.  Colonial people in Lima became used to living an ostentatious and courtly life style that people in the other capital cities of Spanish America did not experience, with the exception of Mexico City and later the city of Bogotá.  On the other hand, they mostly lived from the riches extracted from the inland mines by the Native Peruvians.

Phonetics and phonology 

In Lima there is no loss of syllable-final  before a vowel or the end of a sentence. It is only aspirated in a preconsonantal position. This is unique, by all the social classes in the whole Latin American coast. The pronunciation of ese is soft predorsal.
The so-called yeísmo and seseo occur.
If the word-final  is not elided, it is hypercorrectively realized as a voiceless stop .
Word-final  is routinely retracted to velar  (the most highlighted Andalusian trait).
Additional marginal consonants  and  exist for Chinese & Japanese proper and common nouns.

Grammatical subject 
Since the use of 'vos' instead of 'tú' as a familiar form of address was a marker of low social class in post-medieval Spanish, it exists throughout contemporary Latin America but it was never used in the capitals of the viceroyalties, such as Lima or Mexico City.

Prescriptive Limeño Spanish has adjusted considerably to more closely resemble the standard Spanish linguistic model, because of the city's disdain of the contact with the Andean world and autochthonous languages for centuries. 

However, until the beginning of the 20th century, speech on the Northern Peruvian coast was similar in many ways with how individuals spoke on the Ecuadorian-Colombian coast. The most remarkable variation from the Castilian norm was the presence of 'vos', which was used to refer to one's family and is completely missing today. This part of Northern Peru also had a strong influence on the extinct Muchik or Mochica language.

Inland immigrants variation 
The other main variety of Spanish from the coast of Peru is that which appeared after the linguistic influence from the Sierra and of the rural environment into the coastal cities and the former 'Garden City' by the Great Andean Migration (1940–1980).

Its main characteristics are:

The strong use of diminutives, double possessives and the routine use of  'pues' or 'pe' and  'nomás' in postverbal position.
The redundant use of verbal clitics, particularly 'lo' (the so-called loismo)
The bilabialization of 
Closed timbre
Andean tone

Recent changes 

This popular variety of Coastal Peruvian dialect is the result of not only Andean but also foreign influences: Anglicisms and Argentinisms are all very present in the lexicon.

Pitucos, young people from Lima's higher socioeconomic strata, have also developed a peculiar and mannered form of speaking, noticeable particularly in the way that they alter their tone of speaking.

Some common expressions 
Agarrar y + to do something  (Agarré y le dije...)
Parar (en) =  to frequently be somewhere or to frequently do something (Paras en la cabina)
Pasar la voz = to inform (e.g. "spread the word")
De repente = perhaps, suddenly (depending on context)
Ni a palos = no way (literally "not even clubbed")

Some common words 
Anticucho = typical food consisting almost always of grilled chicken or cow heart.
Disforzarse = to be anxious.
Tombo = police officer or soldier.
Calato = nude.
Chicotazo = whiplash.
Fresco/a (or conchudo/a) = shameless person.
Fregar (or joder) = to bother, to ruin.
Gallinazo = a turkey buzzard or black-headed vulture-scavenger bird of Peru.
Garúa = tenuous rain.
Guachimán = adaptation of the English word watchman, meaning the same.
Huachafo = ridiculous, gaudy (said of clothing).
Huasca = to be drunk.
Alucina = a word that more or less means: "can you believe it?".
Jarana = a party with folk music.
Juerga = a party.
Óvalo = a roundabout.
Panteón = a cemetery.
Penar = said of a place, to have ghosts roaming around.
Pericote = a mouse.
Poto = buttocks.
Zamparse = to break into a place (as in a waiting line, or crashing a party), or to get drunk.

Some informal words of extended use 
Aguantar = to wait, to resist

Causa = friend, pal
Combi = small public transport van (ex. Toyota Hiace)
Chibolo/a = child, adolescent (disrespectful if the person is older)
Paltearse = to be embarrassed coming from the word for avocado (palta), to fear 
Pata = friend, pal
Pollada = party where cheap food and drink is served in order to raise money (poor, low-class phenomenon similar to a potluck)

Yara/Yaraza = be careful

Contributions by other ethnic groups 
Peruvians of foreign blood, especially of Chinese and Japanese descent, from first and second generations have a tinge of their native languages' rhythm and intonation to Lima accent, but most of the younger generations have no trace of their ancestry languages' accent, if they speak it in the first place.

Slang 
Some Peruvian slang comes from inverting the syllables of a word. This can be seen in words like 'fercho', which comes from the word 'chofer', driver, the word 'tolaca', which comes from 'calato'.  Slang words do not always have to be the exact inverse of the original word: for example 'mica' comes from the word 'camisa', which means shirt. Or 'jerma' which comes from 'mujer' meaning woman.

Peruvian slang originally developed in the 1970s and 1980s with the experience of military dictatorships and the ever-present threat of terrorist activities from Maoist groups such as the MRTA and Sendero Luminoso.

References

Bibliographic sources

External links 
The Spanish of Peru

Spanish dialects of South America
Languages of Peru
Spanish Peruvian